The 2nd Wisconsin Cavalry Regiment was a volunteer cavalry regiment that served in the Union Army during the American Civil War.

Service
The 2nd Wisconsin Cavalry was organized at Milwaukee, Wisconsin, between December 30, 1861, and March 10, 1862.

The regiment was mustered out of Federal service at Austin, Texas, on November 15, 1865, and disbanded at Madison, Wisconsin, on December 14, 1865.

Total strength and casualties
The 2nd Wisconsin Cavalry initially recruited 1,127 officers and men.  An additional 998 men were recruited as replacements, for a total of 2,125 men.

The regiment suffered 24 enlisted men killed or died from wounds in action, and 4 officers and 284 enlisted men who died of disease, for a total of 312 fatalities.

Commanders
 Colonel Cadwallader C. Washburn
 Colonel Thomas Stephens
 Lieutenant Colonel Levi Sterling
 Lieutenant Colonel H. Eugene Eastman
 Lieutenant Colonel Nicholas H. Dale

Notable people
 Albert Webb Bishop was captain of Co. B, resigned to accept appointment as lieutenant colonel of the 1st Arkansas Cavalry Regiment and went on to serve as a public official and University president in Arkansas.
 Napoleon Boardman, father of Charles R. Boardman, was 1st lieutenant in Co. A and later detailed as chief of ordinance on the staff of General William Rosecrans and rose to the rank of colonel.
 William Henry Brisbane was chaplain of the regiment.  Before the war, he was an abolitionist activist who freed a number of enslaved people from the south and settled them in the north.
 Charles L. Catlin was enlisted in Co. D and served through the entire war.  After he served as a Wisconsin legislator.
 Samuel A. Cook was enlisted in Co. A for the final months of the war.  After the war he served as a U.S. congressman.
 Melvin Grigsby was enlisted in Co. C and was a prisoner of war.  After the war he became the 3rd Attorney General of South Dakota and later served as colonel of the 3rd U.S. Cavalry Regiment during the Spanish–American War.
 William J. Hoynes was enlisted in Co. D.  Earlier in the war he served in the 20th Wisconsin Infantry Regiment and was wounded at the Battle of Prairie Grove.  After the war he was the first dean of the law department at the University of Notre Dame.
 Edward S. Minor was enlisted in Co. E and later promoted to sergeant.  Near the end of the war he was commissioned as 1st lieutenant of the company.  After the war he served as a Wisconsin legislator and U.S. congressman.
 William H. Morgan was adjutant of the regiment, and later adjutant of the brigade and the division.  After the war he received an honorary brevet to brigadier general.
 Sewall A. Phillips was enlisted in Co. A.  After the war he served as a Wisconsin legislator.
 George N. Richmond was captain of Co. E. and later major of the 3rd battalion.  After the war he was a Wisconsin state senator and Mayor of Appleton, Wisconsin.
 Reuben B. Showalter was enlisted in Co. C for the last year of the war.  After the war he served as a Wisconsin legislator.
 Horatio H. Virgin, son of Noah Virgin, was adjutant of the 1st battalion and later became lieutenant colonel of the 33rd Wisconsin Infantry Regiment and received an honorary brevet to colonel.

See also

 List of Wisconsin Civil War units
 Wisconsin in the American Civil War

References

External links
Wisconsin Department of Veterans Affairs. Civil War Regimental Histories
Second Wisconsin Cavalry
The Civil War Archive

Military units and formations established in 1861
Military units and formations disestablished in 1865
Units and formations of the Union Army from Wisconsin
1861 establishments in Wisconsin